Nesterovsky (masculine), Nesterovskaya (feminine), or Nesterovskoye (neuter) is the name of several rural localities in Russia.

Arkhangelsk Oblast
As of 2011, seven rural localities in Arkhangelsk Oblast bear this name:
Nesterovskaya, Krasnoborsky District, Arkhangelsk Oblast, a village in Permogorsky Selsoviet of Krasnoborsky District
Nesterovskaya, Nyandomsky District, Arkhangelsk Oblast, a village in Moshinsky Selsoviet of Nyandomsky District
Nesterovskaya, Shenkursky District, Arkhangelsk Oblast, a village in Fedorogorsky Selsoviet of Shenkursky District
Nesterovskaya, Velsky District, Arkhangelsk Oblast, a village in Puysky Selsoviet of Velsky District
Nesterovskaya, Fedkovsky Selsoviet, Verkhnetoyemsky District, Arkhangelsk Oblast, a village in Fedkovsky Selsoviet of Verkhnetoyemsky District
Nesterovskaya, Puchuzhsky Selsoviet, Verkhnetoyemsky District, Arkhangelsk Oblast, a village in Puchuzhsky Selsoviet of Verkhnetoyemsky District
Nesterovskaya, Vilegodsky District, Arkhangelsk Oblast, a village in Belyayevsky Selsoviet of Vilegodsky District

Republic of Ingushetia
As of 2011, one rural locality in the Republic of Ingushetia bears this name:
Nesterovskaya, Republic of Ingushetia, a stanitsa in Sunzhensky District

Volgograd Oblast
As of 2011, one rural locality in Volgograd Oblast bears this name:
Nesterovsky (rural locality), a khutor in Sukhovsky Selsoviet of Alexeyevsky District

Vologda Oblast
As of 2011, two rural localities in Vologda Oblast bear this name:
Nesterovskoye, Cherepovetsky District, Vologda Oblast, a village in Anninsky Selsoviet of Cherepovetsky District
Nesterovskoye, Vologodsky District, Vologda Oblast, a village in Novlensky Selsoviet of Vologodsky District